An impaler is a person who inflicts impalement.

Impaler may also refer to:

People
The Impaler, nickname of Jonathon Sharkey (born 1964), American professional wrestler and politician 
Vlad the Impaler (1431– 1476), posthumous name given to Vlad III, Prince of Wallachia

Entertainment
Impaler (band), horror punk band from Minnesota
Lex the Impaler, American pornographic film series starring Lexington Steele
Nikos the Impaler, 2003 American splatter film

Sports
 Impaler, the finishing move of professional wrestler Gangrel

See also
Impala (disambiguation)